Thomas Cole (born 28 May 1997) is an Australian rules footballer playing for the West Coast Eagles in the Australian Football League (AFL). He was drafted by the West Coast Eagles with their second selection and thirty-sixth overall in the 2015 national draft. He made his debut in the seventy-seven point win against  in round 10, 2016 at Domain Stadium. In round 19, 2018, Cole was nominated for the AFL Rising Star after recording 18 disposals, 11 intercept possessions and 5 rebound 50s in a 40 point loss to North Melbourne. He married Lily Burke in December 2022.

Statistics
Statistics are correct to the end of round 7, 2019

|- style="background-color: #EAEAEA"
! scope="row" style="text-align:center" | 2016
|style="text-align:center;"|
| 28 || 2 || 0 || 0 || 13 || 13 || 26 || 8 || 2 || 0.0 || 0.0 || 6.5 || 6.5 || 13.0 || 4.0 || 1.0
|-
! scope="row" style="text-align:center" | 2017
|style="text-align:center;"|
| 28 || 4 || 0 || 0 || 17 || 16 || 33 || 7 || 10 || 0.0 || 0.0 || 4.3 || 4.0 || 83 || 1.8 || 2.5
|- style="background:#eaeaea;"
|style="text-align:center;background:#afe6ba;"|2018†
|style="text-align:center;"|
| 28 || 21 || 0 || 1 || 151 || 124 || 275 || 73 || 51 || 0.0 || 0.0 || 7.2 || 5.9 || 13.1 || 3.5 || 2.4
|-
! scope="row" style="text-align:center" | 2019
|style="text-align:center;"|
| 28 || 7 || 0 || 0 || 54 || 31 || 85 || 31 || 23 || 0.0 || 0.0 || 7.7 || 4.4 || 12.1 || 4.4 || 3.3
|- class="sortbottom"
! colspan=3| Career
! 34 !! 0 !! 1 !! 235 !! 184 !! 419 !! 119 !! 86 !! 0.0 !! 0.0 !! 6.9 !! 5.4 !! 12.3 !! 3.5 !! 2.5
|}

References

External links

1997 births
Living people
West Coast Eagles players
West Coast Eagles Premiership players
Australian rules footballers from Victoria (Australia)
Bendigo Pioneers players
West Coast Eagles (WAFL) players
East Perth Football Club players
One-time VFL/AFL Premiership players